Iron Dawn is a fantasy novel written by Matthew Woodring Stover, and published in 1997 by Roc Books.

Set a decade after the fall of Troy, the novel tells the tale of three mercenaries who fight to stop an evil necromancer from taking over the city 
of Tyre.

1997 novels
1997 fantasy novels
American fantasy novels
Novels set in ancient Troy